Bilbil is the word for 'nightingale' in various Middle Eastern languages. It may also be:

Bilbil Klosi
Bilbil language
Mount Bilbil
Bilbil juglet

See also
Bilbija
Bülbül